The Rockland Rural Historic District is a large rural historic district located near Front Royal in northeastern Warren County, Virginia. This area has unspoiled vistas of farms and rural crossroads communities, with a road network and land-use pattern dating to the 18th century.

The district was listed on the National Register of Historic Places in 2015.  It includes two previously-listed properties: Erin and Mount Zion.

See also
National Register of Historic Places listings in Warren County, Virginia

References

Historic districts in Warren County, Virginia
National Register of Historic Places in Warren County, Virginia
Historic districts on the National Register of Historic Places in Virginia